The Teatro Verdi is a theater and opera house in Sassari, Italy named after composer Giuseppe Verdi. Constructed in 1883-1884, the theater was inaugurated with composer 's opera Riccardo III on 8 December 1884. The original theater was destroyed by a fire in 1923. It was rebuilt three years later in its present form and went under a massive restoration in 1984. The theater remains an important cultural center for the arts in Sassari, hosting performances of concerts, plays, musicals, and operas.

External links
Official Website of Teatro Verdi Sassari

Opera houses in Italy
1895 establishments in Italy
Culture in Sassari
Theatres in Sassari